The Cannonball Adderley Quintet & Orchestra (also known as Experience in E) is an album by jazz saxophonist Cannonball Adderley recorded in Los Angeles, California in 1970 featuring performances by Adderley's Quintet featuring Nat Adderley, Joe Zawinul, Walter Booker and Roy McCurdy with an unidentified orchestra conducted by William Fisher or Lalo Schifrin.

Reception
The Allmusic review awarded the album 3 stars.

Track listing 
 "Experience in E" (Joe Zawinul, William Fischer) – 20:00  
 "Tensity" (David Axelrod) – 12:38  
 "Dialogues for Jazz Quintet and Orchestra" (Lalo Schifrin) – 12:39

Personnel 
Cannonball Adderley Quintet
 Cannonball Adderley - alto saxophone
 Nat Adderley - cornet
 Joe Zawinul - piano, electric piano
 Walter Booker - bass
 Roy McCurdy - drums
Plus
 William Fisher - conductor (tracks 1 & 2)
 Lalo Schifrin - conductor (track 3)
 Unidentified orchestra

References 

1970 albums
Capitol Records albums
Cannonball Adderley albums
Albums produced by David Axelrod (musician)